Flor Añorve Ocampo (born 21 March 1961) is a Mexican politician from the Institutional Revolutionary Party. From 2000 to 2003 she served as Deputy of the LVIII Legislature of the Mexican Congress representing Guerrero.

References

1961 births
Living people
Politicians from Guerrero
People from Taxco
Women members of the Chamber of Deputies (Mexico)
Institutional Revolutionary Party politicians
21st-century Mexican politicians
21st-century Mexican women politicians
Autonomous University of Guerrero alumni
Deputies of the LVIII Legislature of Mexico
Members of the Chamber of Deputies (Mexico) for Guerrero